The Superior Court of California, County of El Dorado, also known as the El Dorado County Superior Court, is the branch of the California superior court with jurisdiction over El Dorado County.

History
El Dorado County was one of the original counties established when California became a state.

Although Coloma, the initial county seat, promised to build several new buildings to serve the county government, an observer noted in 1856 "the present buildings are not suitable in which to transact the business of the Empire county" and the county seat was moved to Placerville in 1857. At least one Coloma resident objected to the move, claiming a new jail and court house were already complete but unoccupied.

In Placerville, a new county courthouse was completed in 1861. The credited architects were Cuff & Diggs of Sacramento.

Court operations eventually outgrew the existing facility and an annex was added in the 1970s; in addition, new court facilities were opened at the County Government Center in the early 1990s.

Venues

In addition to the buildings in Placerville, satellite courts for El Dorado County operate in Cameron Park and South Lake Tahoe.

References

External links
 

Superior Court
Superior courts in California